Donald Grant (1888–1970) was as Australian politician.

Donald Grant can also refer to:

Given and family name 
Bud Grant (broadcaster) (B. Donald Grant, 1932–2011), American television executive
Donald M. Grant (1927–2009), American publisher
Donald Grant, English-language broadcaster for Nazi Germany
Donald Grant of Grant, 5th Baron Strathspey (1912–1992), of the Barons Strathspey
M. Donald Grant (1904–1988), American baseball club owner
Donald Grant (rugby union) (1892–1962), Scottish rugby union player
Donald Grant (politician), Western Cape Provincial Minister of Transport and Public Works
Donald Grant (surveyor), Australian surveyor

Both given names 
Donald Grant Creighton (1902–1979), Canadian historian
Donald Grant Devine (born 1944), Canadian politician, premier of Saskatchewan
Donald Duffy (Donald Grant Duffy, 1915–1995), Australian doctor
Donald Grant McLeod (born 1959), former field hockey player from New Zealand
Donald Grant Millard (died 1964), American pilot, was shot down in East Germany during 1964 T-39 shootdown incident
Donald Grant Mitchell (1822–1908), American essayist and novelist
Donald Grant Nutter (1915–1962), American politician, governor of Montana
Donald Thomas (American football) (Donald Grant Thomas, born 1985), American football player

See also 
Donald M. Grant, Publisher, a fantasy and science fiction small press publisher